Jazovo is a village in Serbia. It is situated in the Čoka municipality, North Banat District, Vojvodina province. The village has a Hungarian ethnic majority 
(85.07%) and its population numbering 978 people (2002 census).

Historical population

1961: 1,729
1971: 1,625
1981: 1,261
1991: 1,118
2002: 978

See also
List of places in Serbia
List of cities, towns and villages in Vojvodina

References
Slobodan Ćurčić, Broj stanovnika Vojvodine, Novi Sad, 1996.

External links

 History of Jazovo 

Populated places in Serbian Banat
Čoka